John Ignatius Nolan (January 14, 1874 – November 18, 1922) was an American iron molder and politician who represented a Californian district in the United States House of Representatives from 1913 to 1922.

Background 
He was born in San Francisco, California on January 14, 1874. He attended the public schools and worked as an iron molder. He was a member of the board of supervisors of the city and county of San Francisco in 1911. In 1912, he was the secretary of the San Francisco Labor Council (he was a member of the Iron Molder's Union).

In Congress; death 
Nolan was elected as a Republican to the 63rd United States Congress as San Francisco's first labor congressman, a staunch progressive reelected to the four succeeding Congresses. He served from March 4, 1913, until his death. During the 66th United States Congress, he was the chairman of the United States House Committee on Patents, and during the 67th United States Congress, he was the chairman of the United States House Committee on Labor.

He had been re-elected in 1922 to the 68th United States Congress before he died in San Francisco, California on November 18, 1922. He was interred at Holy Cross Cemetery in Colma, California. After he died, his vacant position in Congress was taken by his wife, Mae Nolan.

See also 
 List of United States Congress members who died in office (1900–49)

References 
 

1874 births
1922 deaths
American Roman Catholics
Burials at Holy Cross Cemetery (Colma, California)
San Francisco Board of Supervisors members
Moldmakers
Republican Party members of the United States House of Representatives from California